Henry Turner Machin  (Born 26 November 1832 at Newcastle-under-Lyme, England. Died 25 April 1918 at Sherbrooke, Quebec) 
was a senior bureaucrat in the province of Quebec.  

He was the son of Reverend Thomas Machin and received his education at the Upper Canada College. He married Lucy Anne Hale, daughter of Edward Hale. 

Machin was presented with the Imperial Service Order for his service as Deputy Minister of the Treasury of the Province of Quebec.   Additionally, he was appointed as the Quebec financial representative in an arbitration case between the Provinces of Quebec and Ontario. This case lasted for eleven years. 

He is buried at Saint Peter Cemetery, 
Sherbrooke, Quebec.

1832 births
1918 deaths
Quebec civil servants
Canadian Companions of the Imperial Service Order
Upper Canada College alumni
English emigrants to Canada